Calumet is an unincorporated community in eastern Pike County, in the U.S. state of Missouri. The community is located at the intersection of Missouri routes N and D about six miles southwest of Clarkesville and six miles north of Eolia. Calumet Creek flows past to the south of the community.

History
A post office called Calumet was established in 1872, and remained in operation until 1907. The community was named after nearby Calumet Creek.

References

Unincorporated communities in Pike County, Missouri
Unincorporated communities in Missouri